Todd Harrity (born September 16, 1990) is an American professional squash player who reached a career-high world ranking of World No. 34 in February 2022. Currently, he is the 2nd ranked American squash player, and is also a three time National Champion, winning in 2015, 2016 and 2019. In 2018, he came out as gay, announcing it on Twitter, thus becoming the first openly gay professional male squash player in the world. At the time he was ranked No. 1 in the United States out of all male squash players.

He is class of 2013 at Princeton University, and he played number 1 all four years for the Tigers varsity squash team.  He won the individual championship during his sophomore season.  He led the Tigers to the team national championship during his junior season.

Career statistics

PSA Titles (4)
All Results for Todd Harrity in PSA World's Tour tournament

PSA Tour Finals (Runner-Up) (7)

References

External links 
 
 
 

1990 births
American male squash players
Princeton Tigers men's squash players
Gay sportsmen
Living people
Pan American Games bronze medalists for the United States
Pan American Games medalists in squash
Squash players at the 2015 Pan American Games
American LGBT sportspeople
LGBT people from Pennsylvania
Squash players at the 2019 Pan American Games
LGBT squash players
Medalists at the 2015 Pan American Games
Medalists at the 2019 Pan American Games